The 2014–15 Biathlon World Cup – Mass start Men started on Sunday December 21, 2014 in Pokljuka and finished on Sunday March 22, 2015 in Khanty-Mansiysk.  The defending titlist Martin Fourcade of France finished on the 3rd place. Anton Shipulin of Russia won the title.

2013-14 Top 3 Standings

Medal winners

Standings

References

Mass start Men